Shadow: Five Presidents and the Legacy of Watergate is a 1999 book by Washington Post journalist Bob Woodward, written with a narrative voice while utilizing firsthand interviews and news reports for its historical basis. For the 608-page book, Woodward used extensive notes and also interviewed President Ford, President Bush's chief of staff, James Baker, and other people of focus.

Its five sections cover:
Gerald Ford - The pardoning of Richard Nixon
Jimmy Carter - The scandals involving administrative officials Bert Lance and Hamilton Jordan
Ronald Reagan - The Iran-Contra Affair
George H. W. Bush - The decisions behind the first Gulf War, "Passportgate" and the resignation of Naval Secretary H. Lawrence Garrett
Bill Clinton - Whitewater controversy, Monica Lewinsky, Paula Jones and Clinton's impeachment trial

The book's final 300 pages cover Bill Clinton's administration. Nearly 100 pages are devoted to Reagan's administration. The book largely delves into the personal discussions that each president had during each issue, with no holds barred regarding profanity. Shadow was written with the research help of Jeff Glasser.

1999 non-fiction books
Books by Bob Woodward
Books about presidents of the United States
Works about the Watergate scandal